An election to Carmarthen District Council was held in May 1979.  It was preceded by the 1976 election and followed by the 1983 election. On the same day, there was a UK General Election and elections to the other local authorities in Wales.

There were contests in only seven of the 21 divisions with eighteen Independent councillors returned unopposed. Plaid Cymru gained three seats to gain representation on the authority for the first time.

Results

Abergwili and Llanllawddog (one seat)

Abernant (one seat)

Carmarthen Town Ward One (four seats)

Carmarthen Town Ward Two (two seats)

Carmarthen Town Ward Three (three seats)
Percy Jones had previously represented the Llangunnor ward.

Cilymaenllwyd (one seat)

Cynwyl Elfed and Llanpumsaint (one seat)

Henllanfallteg (one seat)

Laugharne Township (two seats)

Llanarthney and Llanddarog (three seats)

Llandyfaelog (two seats)

Llangeler (two seats)

Llanfihangel-ar-Arth (one seat)

Llanfihangel Rhos-y-Corn (one seat)

Llangain (one seat)

Llangynnwr (two seats)

Llangyndeyrn (two seats)

Llanllwni (two seats)

Newcastle Emlyn (one seat)

St Clears (two seats)

Whitland (one seat)

References

1979
1979 Welsh local elections
20th century in Carmarthenshire